The Saint John Mohawks were an early amateur senior ice hockey team based in Saint John, New Brunswick, Canada in the 1890s and first decade of the 1900s. The team was the Maritimes champion of ice hockey in 1899.

References

Defunct ice hockey teams in Canada
1890s establishments in New Brunswick
Ice hockey teams in New Brunswick
Ice hockey in Saint John, New Brunswick
Sports clubs established in the 1890s